Koh Kong District is a district (srok) of Koh Kong Province, in south-western Cambodia. The southern parts of Koh Kong district is part of Botum Sakor National Park since 1993. It comprise roughly one-third of the district.

Administration
The district is subdivided into three khum (communes) and nine phum (villages).

See also
 Botum Sakor National Park

Notes

Districts of Koh Kong province